Fenglin Township, is an urban township in central Hualien County, Taiwan. It is located in Huatung Valley bordering Shoufeng Township on the north and Guangfu Township on the south. It has a population of around 10,552 inhabitants in 12 villages.

Geography

The administration area here is 120.518 km2, and located in the Huatung Valley plain between Central Mountain Range and Hai'an Range (Coastal Range).

Administrative divisions
Fengren, Fengyi, Fengli, Fengzhi, Fengxin, Shanxing, Darong, Beilin, Nanping, Linrong, Zhangqiao and Senrong Village.

Education
Fenglin Township has 3 junior high schools and 8 elementary schools. Fenglin Senior High School and 1 university are planning for construction.

Tourist attractions
 Fenglin Hakka Cultural Museum
 Fenglin Recreation Area
 Fenglin Road Park
 Fenglin Township Vegetable Area
 Jianying Park
 Linrong Recreation Area
 Lintian Police Substation and Old Lintian Police Station
 Cilakaiyan Tribe (吉拉卡樣部落)
 Lintianshan Forestry Culture Park
 Principle Dream Factory

Events
 Mipaliw Wetlands Art Festival

Transportation

Railway
TRA Taitung Line (Huadong Line)
Linrong Station
Nanping Station
Fenglin Station
Wanrong Station

Road

Provincial Highway No.9 (Huadong Highway)
Provincial Highway No.16 Eastern segment

Notable natives
 Chang Fu-hsing, Magistrate of Hualien County (2001-2003)

References

External links 

 花蓮縣鳳林鎮公所 

Townships in Hualien County